The New Zealand Wills Masters was a golf tournament held in New Zealand played from 1965 to 1967. The Wills Classic had been held in New Zealand in 1963 and 1964. A Wills Masters tournament was also held in Australia from 1963. The tournament had prize money of NZ£2,000 in 1966 and NZ$4,000 in 1967. The sponsor was W.D. & H.O. Wills, a cigarette manufacturer.

Winners

References

Golf tournaments in New Zealand
Recurring sporting events established in 1965
Recurring events disestablished in 1967
1965 establishments in New Zealand
1967 disestablishments in New Zealand